Theodore Roosevelt High School (RHS), is located in southeast Fresno, California. It is a high school established within the Fresno Unified School District. The high school mascot is the Rough Rider (in physical form it is a horse) named after the 1st U.S. Volunteer Cavalry Regiment Theodore Roosevelt organized and helped command during the Spanish–American War. The high school's colors are green and gold.

The school was opened in 1928, and was both a junior and senior high school. It now serves grades 9-12.
During the 2011–2012 school year 2,184 students attended RHS.

The school received publicity in 2014 with the movie documentary Try which focused on Roosevelt's rugby program and the positive effect it has had on the high school students who began playing.

Theodore Roosevelt High School Auditorium

The Roosevelt Auditorium was Dedicated on Wednesday, September 22, 1958 at 10 A.M. Open House was from 7:30 - 10:00 P.M. by The Fresno City Board of Education, The Superintendent of Schools and the Administrative Staff, The Architects, Lake and DI Luck, The Builders, Harris Construction Company, The Principle and Faculty Members of Roosevelt Student Body, and the Roosevelt Parent Teacher Association and the Roosevelt Dad's Club.

When the auditorium was built it included the main auditorium with seating capacity of 2,153 and a smaller theater seating 200. Allied classrooms included a music room, two regular class rooms, a stagecraft, electrical and radio shop, a radio studio class room with recording and control room equipment as well as dressing rooms and make-up rooms.

"We thank Mrs. Elizabeth Kircher for organizing the ceremonies, the Harris Construction Company for supplying the programs, and the San Francisco Floral Company for supplying the flowers. The school is especially thankful to the Board of Education, the City School Administrative Staff and the people of Fresno.  The long patient waiting is over; the dream of an auditorium has become a glorious reality."

Program: 
Roosevelt Alma Mater by the Roosevelt Choir, Student Body; 
March by the Roosevelt Band and Director Robert Arnold; 
Presentation of Colors by the Color Guard (Sgt. David Dague, Sgt. James Windsor, Sgt. David Nattenberg, and Sgt. Joe Anderton);
Flag Salute led by Lt. Gilbert Bertoldi; 
America the Beautiful sung by members of the Roosevelt Choir with Jay Condit, Director;
Presentation of Mr. Edwin C. Kratt by Mr. Robert Miner, Superintendent of Fresno City Unified School District Principle of Roosevelt High School);
Presentation of Members of Board of Education by Mr. Kratt (Mrs. Margaret Robinson, President; Mr. Arthur L. Selland, Vice-President; Dean James M. Mallock; Mr. George W. Turner and Mrs. Geraldine Wheeler;
Presentation of Assistant Superintendents by Mr. Kratt (Mr. Erwin A Dann, Assistant Superintendent in Charge of Secondary Schools; Mr. Lawrence Todhunter, Assistant Superintendent in charge of Elementary Education; Mr. J. C. Trombetta, Assistant Superintendent in charge of Business Services;
Presentation of Platform Guests by Mr. Dann (Mr. Elso Di Luck, Representative of Architects; Mr. Clarence Harris, Representative of Harris Construction Co.; Mr. Robert Hampton, Fresno City Schools Building Inspector; Mr. Marvin Abrahamson, Supt. of Building, Grounds and Maintenance, Fresno City Schools; Mr. James B. Dinsdale, Fresno Junior College, Electrical Inspector; Mrs. Nat Leas, President Roosevelt Parent Teacher Association; and Mr. Michael Sohigian, President Roosevelt Dad's Club;
Introduction of Mrs. Margaret Robinson by Mr. Kratt;
Dedication Address by Mrs. Robinson;
Response for Roosevelt High School by Mr. Miner;
Response for Roosevelt Student Body by Jerry Fitzmaurice, Student Body Pres.;
Prayer by Dean James Malloch;
The Lords Prayer by Roosevelt High School Band.

Roosevelt School of the Arts
The Roosevelt School of the Arts is a district-wide magnet school program established in 1984. The program offers students in-depth specialized training in performing, visual, and media arts. The Roosevelt School of the Arts program was recognized as a winner of the Kennedy Center Alliance for Arts Education "Creative Ticket National School of Distinction Award", one of five schools to receive this award for outstanding achievement in Arts Education. On May 26, 2018, the Roosevelt Auditorium was named in honor of 1988 RSA alumna Audra McDonald, a six-time Tony Award winner.

Awards and recognition
RHS was recognized by the California State Board of Education in 1996 California Distinguished School Award. The school has also won two Golden Bell Awards. RHS renewed their WASC accreditation in 2017.

Demographics
Many of its students are immigrants from Mexico and Southeast Asia. 51.8% of the student population are English learners. Below are rough figures of the student population.

RHS has many programs to serve its students, including an extensive After School Program, Migrant Education tutoring, and academies and pathways, including Health, Business, Public Service, and Education.

Athletics
The varsity boys soccer team has won six out of the last eight central section championships, in 2001, 2005, 2007, 2008, 2009, and 2013

Notable alumni
Chris Gorham, actor
Wade Blasingame, Major League Baseball pitcher
Randy Scarbery, Major League Baseball pitcher
Mike Dupree, Major League Baseball pitcher
Jack Shepard, Major League Baseball catcher
Johnny Estrada, Major League Baseball catcher
Sharon Leal, actress
Audra McDonald, actress and singer
Gary Soto, author
Heidi Blickenstaff, actress
Mick Wingert, voice actor
Virak Ou, human rights activist
Taku Hirano, percussionist
Miranda Rae Mayo, actress
Gary Alcorn, NBA
Louis Jackson, NFL player
Safiya Noble, professor
Bryson Williams, Basketball Player

Notable faculty
Dale Doig, politician and educator

References

External links
Roosevelt High School Official site
Roosevelt School of the Arts Official Site

High schools in Fresno, California
Public high schools in California
Magnet schools in California
1928 establishments in California
Educational institutions established in 1928